Ahmad Laat (Urdu: مولانا احمد لاٹ) is an Indian Islamic cleric and preacher and a leader of Tablighi Jamaat. He heads the shura faction of Tablighi Jamaat at Nerul Markaz. He also delivers speeches in Raiwind Ijtema every year.

Biography
Laat is from Surat, Gujarat. He is member of the international advisory council of the Tablighi Jamaat.

References

Living people
Tablighi Jamaat people
Year of birth missing (living people)
Deobandis